Gudeodiscus villedaryi is a species of air-breathing land snail, a terrestrial pulmonate gastropod mollusk in the family Plectopylidae.

Distribution
The distribution of Gudeodiscus villedaryi includes Thái Nguyên Province and Lạng Sơn Province in Vietnam.

The type locality is Lạng Sơn Province and Bắc Ninh Province (in French original: "Région de Lang-son et de Bac-ninh").

Ecology
It is a ground-dwelling species as all other plectopylid snails in Vietnam.

It co-occurs with other plectopylids in Vietnam: with Gudeodiscus anceyi and with Gudeodiscus phlyarius.

References

External links

Plectopylidae
Gastropods described in 1888
Gastropods of Asia
Invertebrates of Vietnam